Lower respiratory can refer to:

 Lower respiratory tract infection
 Lower respiratory tract